Bracciano is a small town in the Italian region of Lazio,  northwest of Rome.  The town is famous for its volcanic lake (Lago di Bracciano or "Sabatino", the eighth largest lake in Italy) and for a particularly well-preserved medieval castle Castello Orsini-Odescalchi.  The lake is widely used for sailing and is popular with tourists; the castle has hosted a number of events, especially weddings of actors and singers.

The town is served by an urban railway (Line FR3) which connects it with Rome (stations of Ostiense and Valle Aurelia) in about 55 minutes. Close to it lie the two medieval towns of Anguillara Sabazia and Trevignano Romano.

Geography

Bracciano's territory lies on the western edge of the Sabatine Hills, a low volcanic hills range encircling Lake Bracciano.

History
There is no certain information about the origins of Bracciano, on the Via Cassia overlooking the lake. It probably rose from one of the numerous towers built in the tenth century as a defence against the Saracen attacks, as implied by the ancient name of Castrum Brachiani. In the eleventh century the neighbouring territory was acquired by the Prefetti di Vico family, who turned the tower into a castle. Ferdinand Gregorovius dated the possession of Bracciano by the Orsini to 1234. The area was later acquired by the Roman hospital of Santo Spirito in Sassia and, from 1375, was a Papal possession.

In 1419 the Colonna Pope Martin V confirmed the fief of Bracciano in the Orsini family branch of Tagliacozzo. Under this powerful family the city developed into a flourishing town, famous in the whole of Italy for its castle, which was enlarged, starting from 1470, by Napoleone Orsini and his son Virginio. In 1481 it housed Pope Sixtus IV, who had fled from the plague in Rome; the Sala Papalina in one of the corner towers commemorates the event. Four years later, however, the city and the castle were ravaged by Papal troops under Prospero Colonna, and subsequently a new line of walls was built.

In 1494 Charles VIII of France and his troops marching against Rome stopped at Bracciano. This act led to the excommunication of the Orsini, and in 1496 the city was besieged by a papal army headed by Giovanni di Candia, son of Pope Alexander VI Borgia, though it resisted successfully. Cesare Borgia, another of Alexander's natural sons, was unsuccessful in his attempt to take the Orsini stronghold a few years later. The sixteenth century was a period of splendour for Bracciano. The notorious spendthrift and libertine Paolo Giordano I Orsini, having married in 1558 Isabella de' Medici, daughter of Cosimo I, Grand Duke of Tuscany, received the title of duke of Bracciano in 1560. The castello received some modernization for the brief visit of the Medici that year. He hired the most prestigious painter available in Rome, Taddeo Zuccaro, to fresco with allegories and coats-of-arms the fortress's most prestigious room, the Sala Papalinia that had been occupied by Sixtus IV. Isabella spent the remainder of her life avoiding a return to the castle, which a modern tourist tradition would have her haunting.

The economy was boosted by the exploitation of sulphur and iron, the production of tapestries and paper. The latter was favoured by the construction of an aqueduct whose ruins can still be seen in the city. Bracciano in this period had some 4,500 inhabitants.

However, the expensive tenor of life of the Orsini eventually damaged the economic conditions of the city. The last great ruler was probably Paolo Giordano II, a patron of arts and literature who made Bracciano a center of culture in Italy. The decline culminated in 1696 when   the castle was sold to Livio Odescalchi, nephew of Pope Innocent XI; the Odescalchi family still retain the castle.

In the castle, richly frescoed friezes and ceilings now contrast with blank walls, which were hung with richly coloured tapestries when the lords of Bracciano were in residence. The important late-15th century frieze showing the labours of Hercules is still visible.

The main economic activities are tourism, services and agriculture. Until the twentieth century the region was notoriously unhealthy for its malaria, now eradicated; as a result, none of the fine villas were built at the water's edge, but all stood on healthier rises of ground.

Main sights

The main monument of Bracciano is its castle, Castello Orsini-Odescalchi, one of the most noteworthy examples of Renaissance military architecture in Italy.

 outside the city, alongside the road leading to Trevignano Romano, is the ancient church of San Liberato (ninth century). It occupies what was once the Roman settlement of Forum Clodii, now surrounded by an herb garden, part of the complex of English-style gardens at the adjoining Villa San Librato, designed by Russell Page in 1965 for the art historian conte Donato Sanminatelli and his contessa, Maria Odescalchi, and carried out over the following decade.

On the same road are the ruins of the Aquae Apollinaris, a complex of baths famous in the Roman age.

At Vigna di Valle, next to the lake, the former seaplane base today houses the Italian Air Force Museum. The museum's four hangars hold a number of historical military aircraft, including famous planes such as the MC. 202, the Supermarine Spitfire, the Savoia Marchetti S.79, the F-104 Starfighter, the Caproni Ca.100 and the Panavia Tornado. Also on view is a remarkable collection of three Schneider Cup racers, including the Macchi M.C.72. The museum stages an annual 'Giornata Azzura' airshow at Pratica di Mare airport.

Climate
The Köppen Climate Classification subtype for this climate is "Csa" (Mediterranean climate).

Twin towns
Bracciano is twinned with
  Neusäß, Germany
  Châtenay-Malabry, France

Filmography
 Medici: Masters of Florence TV series (Castle Bracciano).
 Elisa di Rivombrosa

See also
Orsini family
Lake of Bracciano

Notes

External links

 Tourist Information
 Castello Orsini-Odescalchi
 Roberto Piperno, "Bracciano"
 Bracciano historical database